Nguékhokh is a town in the Thiès Region of western Senegal. It is in the M'bour Department. The population in 2012 was 20,053, an increase from the 16,911 counted in 2002.

The town received commune status in 1996. It is on the national route N1, between M'bour and Rufisque. A wine production facility opened here in 2015, sparking some controversy.

References

External links
Weather averages

Populated places in Thiès Region
Communes of Senegal